Buckollia is a genus of plants in the Apocynaceae, first described in 1994. It is native to eastern Africa.

Etymology
Buckollia is a taxonomic anagram derived from the name of the genus Bullockia. The latter name is a taxonomic patronym honoring the English botanist Arthur Allman Bullock.

Systematics
According to The Plant List, there are two species in this genus.
 Buckollia tomentosa (E.A.Bruce) Venter & R.L.Verh. - Uganda
 Buckollia volubilis (Schltr.) Venter & R.L.Verh. - Ethiopia, Kenya, Tanzania

References

Periplocoideae
Apocynaceae genera